Homalopoma rubidum is a species of small sea snail with calcareous opercula, a marine gastropod mollusk in the family Colloniidae.

Description
The shell grows to a height of 10 mm.

Distribution
This species occurs in the Pacific Ocean off Panama.

References

External links
 To World Register of Marine Species
 

Colloniidae
Gastropods described in 1908